Liseberg is an amusement park located in Gothenburg, Sweden, that opened in 1923. It is one of the most visited amusement parks in Scandinavia, attracting about three million visitors annually. Among the noteworthy attractions is the wooden roller coaster Balder, twice (2003 and 2005) voted as the Best Wooden Tracked Roller Coaster in the world in a major international poll. The park itself has also been chosen as one of the top ten amusement parks in the world (2005) by Forbes magazine.

In addition to the summer season, the park is also open during October to December, albeit with fewer rides operating, hosting a Halloween season with various houses of horrors and a Christmas market, with traditional Swedish cuisine such as mulled wine and specialties such as döner kebab made from reindeer meat.

The official colors of Liseberg are pink and green as can be seen on the entrance and the older houses in the park; the colors were also adopted for the logo, which was introduced in the 1980s, but changed in 2013 to the current logo.

History 
In 1752, the landowner Johan Anders Lamberg named his property Lisas berg ("Lisa's Mountain") after his wife Elisabeth Söderberg. The area eventually became known as Liseberg.

In 1908, Gothenburg City bought the property, including the on-site buildings, for 225,000 Swedish kronor.

In 1923, Gothenburg celebrated its 300-year anniversary with the Gothenburg Exhibition, which included a Leisure Park and the Congress Park; the area was opened on 8 May and included fun slides and the 980 ft long wooden Kanneworffska Funicular, designed by the Danish amusement builder Waldemar Lebech (originally there were 5 trains with 3 cars each that accommodated 10 people in each car, the ride lasted 2 and half-minute; the ride was demolished in 1987 after having served over 41 million visitors). The fun park was originally intended as a temporary attraction for the Exhibition, but it became such a success with over 800,000 visitors in just over a month, that it was kept open. With an area of 1,500,000 m2 the park had cost 2.6 million kronors to build.
 
On 24 November 1924, the Gothenburg City Council decided to purchase the Liseberg amusement park for 1 million kronor. In 1925, the amusement park was taken over by the municipal company Liseberg AB. The park's first director and one of its initiators was the legendary "carpenter from Skåne" Herman Lindholm, who managed it 1923–42.

On 13 August 1935, the functional-inspired Liseberg Bath was inaugurated, created by engineer KI Schön Anderson. The pool was 15 meters wide and 36 meters long and sported underwater Lights and artificial waves. The Pool was able to receive 800 people at a time, entrance fee with a cabin was 50 cents. The Swedish Olympic hopeful champion from 1920, Arvid Wallman, inaugurated the facilities. The pool was closed in 1956 and the building was demolished in 1962 for the forthcoming 40th anniversary in 1963.

Rotundan was one of the largest dancehalls when it opened on 10 January 1940. Its architect was Axel Jonson, and the construction lasted for one year at a cost of approximately 500,000 SEK. The dance floor held 1,200 persons and on the second floor a bar with the name Uggleklubben was opened. In 1956, the facility was renovated and its name changed to the Rondo. The architect Gunnar Aspe was behind the work, which cost 1 million dollars.
 
In 1947, Liseberg AB opened hotel facilities; Hotell Liseberg Heden. Right from the start one of the objectives of Liseberg was that it would be an opportunity for Gothenburg dwellers to experience recreation and the scenery, and in 1959 it opened the Princess Birgitta, a flower exhibition. During the opening ceremony, 15,000 roses were strewn over the park by helicopter. In 1977, Honor Place was founded, a collection of many of the world's largest celebrity hand impressions. At the time, there were 50 imprints; today, there are more than can fit the area, so an annual selection is made as to who should get the honor to appear.

In 1991, the Liseberg Guest AB was formed to oversee the running of Gothenburg campsites and harbor. In the 1990s the park was expanded by 35 000 square meters and a host of new attractions was inaugurated. In 2015 Lisebergs different companies consolidated into one: Liseberg AB.

The park 
In addition to the park's more than 30 different rides, Liseberg has many venues (stages, dance hall, restaurants and arcade halls). The park has two entrances / exits (one at Örgrytevägen, the other at Getebergsled). Much of the park is forested.

In 1983, the green-pink bunny, Liseberg Rabbit, became the park's symbol and mascot.

In 1998, That year's Sveriges Television's Christmas calendar När karusellerna sover was filmed there.

The park is noted for its Lisebergs Lustgarten (botanical garden) that is landscaped and has many waterfalls, artworks and a variety of plants.

Liseberg Main Stage (Stora Scenen) was built in 1923 and was originally designed as a big music pavilion for the Gothenburg Symphony Orchestra and other large-scale concerts (over the years the design of the venue has been modified). Bands such as Abba and the Rolling Stones have performed here. Right next to the Stora Scenen is the smaller Kvarnteatern which plays host to various smaller events, in particular children's theater.

Polka (Polketten) is the dance hall that was built in 1925 but has since been moved to its current location. The Taube Scene was inaugurated in 2008 and is named after Evert Taube; this venue is used for different types of music such as jazz, and the Liseberg Orchestra plays here as well.

Adjacent to Liseberg Park are more venues: Lisebergshallen is an entertainment and sports arena, home to the local floorball team and team handball team. Rondo is the name of a show venue and Liseberg Theater is a local theater.

Multifarious Swedish performers have performed at Liseberg since its opening. Among them, Zarah Leander, Maurice Chevalier, Marlene Dietrich, Evert Taube, ABBA, Lasse Dahlquist, Birgit Nilsson, Pernilla Wahlgren and Carola Häggkvist. Sten-Åke Cederhök played in 25 years' own perceptions of the "Week Revy". Other artists like Sonya Hedenbratt, Hagge Geigert and Laila Westersund have appeared countless times at Liseberg. Olof Palme gave a speech on the main stage during his last election in 1985.

International acts who have performed at Liseberg include Bob Marley, Led Zeppelin, The Rolling Stones, Cliff Richard, Nightwish, Delta Rhythm Boys, The Jimi Hendrix Experience, Cat Stevens, The Beach Boys, The Kinks, The Who, PJ Proby, Frank Zappa with The Mothers of Invention, Bill Haley & His Comets, Procol Harum, and Toto, among others.

Since 2004 a sing-along show called Lotta på Liseberg (Lotta at Liseberg), hosted by Lotta Engberg, is held every summer at Stora scenen in Liseberg, which airs over TV4 since 2009.

Rides and attractions

Roller coasters

Water rides 
FlumeRide – a 630 m log flume ride that has 2 drops, the higher of which is 14 m (opened in 1973). Arrow Development.
Kållerado – a rapids ride on a 9-passenger boat that navigates a 560 m course through waterfalls and foliage (opened in 1997). Intamin.
Skepp o´skoj

Other rides 
 AeroSpin  – a 35 m SkyRoller. Opened in 2016 Gerstlauer.
 AtmosFear – originally an observation tower that was built in 1990, but was converted into a 116 m drop tower in 2011; height limit 140 cm. Intamin. The longest free fall in Europe.
 Bumper Cars – opened in 1988, but new cars were installed in 2010.
 Bushållplatsen
 Children's Paradise
 Cyklonen
 The Dragon boats
 Fishing Boats
 Flygis
 Flying Elephants
 Gasten Ghost Hotel
 Hanghai – Mega Disco, opened in 2009; height limit 130 cm. Zamperla.
 Hissningen
 Hoppalång
 House of Mirrors – walkthrough mirror maze that opened back in 1961.
 Högspänningen
 JukeBox – a polyp spinner that opened in 2012 and replaced an older model designed by Anton Schwarzkopf; height limit 110 cm. Gerstlauer.
 Kaninlandsbanan
 Lilla Lots
 The Liseberg Wheel – a 60 m tall Ferris wheel that was opened in 2012. Bussnik / Maurer Söhne.
 Loke – a 27 m tall Gyro Swing. Opening in 2017. Intamin.
 Mechanica – a 28 m custom Star Shape. Opened in 2015 Zierer.
 Oldtimers
 Rabbit Land
 Rabbit River
 Screamin' Swing
 Skepp o' skoj
 Teacups
 Tuta & Kör
 Uppswinget – Screamin' Swing ride that opened in 2007; height limit 140 cm. S&S Worldwide.
 Venetian Carousel
 Waltzer – spinner; height limit 110 cm/130 cm alone.
 Wave Swinger – wave swinger that opened in 1989. Zierer.

Children's rides 
 Bushållplatsen– a playground situated in Kaninlandet that opened 2013.
 Cyklonen – on track cycle ride that opened in 2013. Zamperla.
 Drakbåtarna – boat circular that opened in 1998. Zierer.
 Fisketuren –  a fast boat circular that opened in 1988. Mack Rides.
 Flygis – flying barrels that go round and round. Zamperla.
 Flygande Elefanter – flying elephants ride that opened in 2010. Fabbri Group.
 Hissningen –  a children's drop tower, opened in 2013. Zierer.
 Hoppalång –  bouncing and spinning circular that opened in 2013. Zamperla.
 Högspänningen –  a flying wheels that opened in 2013. Metallbau Emmeln.
 Kaninlandsbanan –  a panorama pedal around Rabbit land that opened in 2013. ETF Ride Systems.
 Lilla Lots – rocking tug that opened in 2006. Zamperla.
 Farfars Bil – Vintage cars that opened in 2013. Replaced the 1979 Ihle Fahrzugbau Vintage cars (1979–2012). Metallbau Emmeln.
 Kaninresan – Slow boat ride that opened in 2001. Mack Rides.
 Skepp o' skoj – water boat ride that opened in 2012. ABC Engineering.
 Teacups – spinning tea cups that opened in 1985. Mack Rides.
 Tuta & Kör – children's bumper cars that opened in 2013. Preston & Barbieri.
 Venetian Carousel – merry-go-round with ponies that opened in 2010. Bertazzon.

Other attractions 
Arcade Games – the park has many different arcade games, test-your-skill games and more. Extra charge.
Gasten Ghost Hotel – a horror maze with actors that opened in 1998; height limit 140 cm. Extra charge.
 Liseberg Lustgarden – a walkthrough botanical and sculpture garden.
 Spelhuset – a two-storey arcade hall full of various arcade games.
Shows – Liseberg hosts numerous shows, concerts and performances of every kind throughout the year, some of which are included in the admission price other cost extra.

Former rides 
Aerovarvet, Intamin Looping Starship (1989–2002)
Bergbanan (roller coaster) (1923–1987)
Break Dance, Huss Breakdance (ride) (1987–1993)
Bumper Cars (1927–1987)
Bumper Cars (1988–1996)
Cinema 180 (1979–1987)
Cirkusexpressen (children's roller coaster) (1977–2008)
Crinoline, carousel (1996–2005)
DiscoRound, Huss DiscoRound (1986–1988)
Enterprise (1976–1982)
HangOver (roller coaster) (1997–2002)
House Upside-Down (1985–1996)
Höjdskräcken, S&S Turbo Drop (2000–2015)
Hökfärden, Huss Condor (1985–1990)
Kanonen (roller coaster) (2005–2016)
Kulingen, Intamin Pirate Ship (2002–2008)
Lisebergstornet (1990–2010)
Lisebergs Loopen (roller coaster) (1980–1995)
Ormen Långe, Zierer Pirate Ship (1980–1989)
Pariserhjulet (Ferris wheel) (1967–2015)
Rainbow, Huss Rainbow (1983–2008)
Snabbtåget (1989–1992)
Super 8 (roller coaster) (1966–1979)
SpinRock, Zamperla Discovery 24 (2002–2016)
TopSpin, Huss Topspin (1993–2006)
Tornado, SDC Galactica (1989–2008)
Uppskjutet, S&S Space Shot (1996–2015)
Fairytale Castle (Sagoslottet) (1968–2017)

Visitors 

* Includes guests to Lisebergsteatern, Rondo, Lisebergshallen and events inside the park

See also 
 Tivoli Gardens, Copenhagen
 Gröna Lund, Stockholm
 TusenFryd, Norway
 Linnanmäki, Finland
 Efteling, Netherlands
 Incidents at European amusement parks

References

External links 

 

 
Buildings and structures in Gothenburg
Amusement parks in Sweden
Tourist attractions in Gothenburg
1923 establishments in Sweden
World's fair sites in Sweden
Amusement parks opened in 1923